Jo Hyeon-woo (born 25 September 1991) is a South Korean footballer who plays as goalkeeper for Ulsan Hyundai and the South Korean national team.

Early life
Jo was raised by his mother and father who was a gymnast in Seoul. Jo decided to become a goalkeeper when he saw Kim Byung-ji's lead while watching 1998 France in elementary. He later said, "I was excited about playing soccer after watching the World Cup as I could be someone else's dream." In his fifth grade, the football coach of Shinjeong Elementary School Ham Sang-heon asked for the best goalkeeper in the schoolyard as he was worried he would not have a goalkeeper. The children pointed to Jo. The coach tested Jo by making him save several shots. This would be the beginning of his career. He has been the main goalkeeper and has played in national tournaments ever since. In response, his old coach said "It was not once or twice that teams won because of Jo's success in the penalty shoot-out".

Club career
After graduating from Sun Moon University, Jo entered the 2013 K League 1 draft and was selected by Daegu FC. He failed to prevent the relegation of his team in his first professional season, and had to compete in the K League 2. Since the 2015 season, Jo evolved into Daegu's first-choice goalkeeper and became the best goalkeeper in the K League 2. He finally helped Daegu promote to the K League 1 in 2016. He also contributed to Daegu's first Korean FA Cup title in 2018.

After a successful career in Daegu, Jo joined Ulsan Hyundai on 20 January 2020. He contributed to Ulsan's K League 1 title in the 2022 season.

International career

Early career
In November 2015, Jo was called up for South Korea's national team by manager Uli Stielike to play in the 2018 FIFA World Cup qualifiers against Laos and Myanmar. He was selected as the national representative for the EAFF E-1 Football Championship in 2017 winning the competition's best goalkeeper award.

2018 FIFA World Cup
In May 2018, Jo was named in South Korea's preliminary 28-man squad for the 2018 FIFA World Cup in Russia. Originally chosen as the third-choice keeper, he ended up in the starting line-up due to the fact that he was taller than the other two keepers, thus making his debut for the first time ever in a major competition. His performances in the first two matches against Sweden and Mexico were impressive, despite both ending in defeats for South Korea. He was lauded particularly for his point-blank save against Swedish striker Marcus Berg which put him in the spotlight. Jo then played a prominent role in Germany's historic elimination from the first round of a World Cup for the first time since 1938 with a stellar performance, earning him the Man of the Match award. Cho made seven saves without conceding any goals. Unbeknownst to Jo or his teammates until the match was over, South Korea was also eliminated from the tournament despite their win (due to Sweden beating Mexico 0–3). South Korea finished ahead of Germany in Group F, placing third.

2018 Asian Games
Jo was named in the South Korean under-23 team for the 2018 Asian Games as an over-aged player. He appeared in two matches against Bahrain and Kyrgyzstan in the group stage and finalized them with clean sheets.
He also played in the round of 16 against Iran, but he was injured in this match. He was replaced by Song Bum-keun in the quarter-finals against Uzbekistan, but Song conceded three goals. Song received criticisms for his poor performance, and so Jo appeared again in semi-finals and final. He contributed to South Korea's gold medal by conceding only two goals in the tournament and was subsequently exempt from mandatory military service.

Career statistics

Club

International

Filmography

Television

Honours
Daegu FC
 Korean FA Cup: 2018

Ulsan Hyundai
 AFC Champions League: 2020
 K League 1: 2022

South Korea U23
Asian Games: 2018

South Korea
EAFF Championship: 2017, 2019

Individual
K League 1 Best XI: 2017, 2018, 2019, 2020, 2021, 2022
K League 2 Best XI: 2015, 2016
EAFF Championship Best Goalkeeper: 2017
AFC Champions League All-Star Squad: 2021

References

External links
 

Jo Hyeon-woo – National Team stats at KFA 

1991 births
Living people
Association football goalkeepers
South Korean footballers
Daegu FC players
K League 1 players
K League 2 players
2018 FIFA World Cup players
South Korea under-20 international footballers
South Korea under-23 international footballers
South Korea international footballers
Footballers from Seoul
Footballers at the 2018 Asian Games
Asian Games medalists in football
Asian Games gold medalists for South Korea
Medalists at the 2018 Asian Games
2019 AFC Asian Cup players
2022 FIFA World Cup players